Kyriakos Michas (born 15 June 1966) is a Greek football manager.

References

1966 births
Living people
Greek football managers
A.O. Glyfada F.C. managers
Vyzas F.C. managers
Proodeftiki F.C. managers
People from Aspropyrgos
Sportspeople from Attica